The close-mid back rounded vowel, or high-mid back rounded vowel, is a type of vowel sound used in some spoken languages.

Close-mid back protruded vowel
The close-mid back protruded vowel is the most common variant of the close-mid back rounded vowel. As there is no dedicated diacritic for protrusion in the IPA, the symbol for the close-mid back rounded vowel with an old diacritic for labialization, can be used as an ad hoc symbol  for the close-mid back protruded vowel.

For the close-mid near-back protruded vowel that is usually transcribed with the symbol , see near-close back protruded vowel.

Features

Occurrence
Because back rounded vowels are assumed to have protrusion, and few descriptions cover the distinction, some of the following may actually have compression.

Close-mid back compressed vowel

There is no dedicated diacritic for compression in the IPA. The spread-lip diacritic  may also be used with a rounded vowel letter  as an ad hoc symbol, but 'spread' technically means unrounded.

Only Wu Chinese is known to contrast it with the more typical protruded (endolabial) close-mid back vowel, but the height of both vowels varies from close to close-mid.

Features

Occurrence

Notes

References

External links
 

Close-mid vowels
Back vowels
Rounded vowels